The Saint Vincent big-eared bat (Micronycteris buriri) is a bat species found on the island of Saint Vincent in Saint Vincent and the Grenadines.

References

Micronycteris
Bats of the Caribbean
Mammals described in 2011